Montreal Stories, also titled Montreal Sextet in some releases, is a Canadian drama film, released in 1991 as an homage to the city of Montreal, Quebec on the occasion of its 350th anniversary. Written and directed by Denys Arcand, Michel Brault, Atom Egoyan, Jacques Leduc, Léa Pool and Patricia Rozema, the film is an anthology of six short films, one by each of the credited directors.

Cast
Actors appearing in the films include Denys Arcand, Philippe Ayoub, Paule Baillargeon, Michel Barrette, Claude Blanchard, Domini Blythe, Geneviève Brouillette, Maury Chaykin, Anne Dorval, Rémy Girard, Élise Guilbault, Yves Jacques, Arsinée Khanjian, Alexandrine Latendresse, Charlotte Laurier, Véronique Le Flaguais, Robert Lepage, Maria del Mar, Sheila McCarthy, Monique Mercure, Jean-Louis Millette, Guylaine St-Onge, Raoul Trujillo, Suzanne Champagne, John Gilbert and Guillermo Verdecchia.

Segments
"Desperanto" (Rozema) — A young housewife from Toronto (Sheila McCarthy) explores Montreal's nightlife.
"La Toile du temps" (Leduc) — The history of a painting of former Montreal mayor Jacques Viger.
"La Dernière partie" (Brault) — Madeleine (Hélène Loiselle) tries to tell Roger (Jean Mathieu) she wants a divorce after forty years of marriage. 
"En passant" (Egoyan) — A visitor to a conference arrives at the airport.
"Rispondetemi" (Pool) — En route to the hospital in an ambulance after a car accident, Sarah (Anne Dorval) recalls her life.
"Vue d'ailleurs" (Arcand) — At a diplomatic reception, an older woman (Domini Blythe) reminisces about a love affair in Montreal in 1967.

See also
The Memories of Angels, a collage film about Montreal
Cosmos, a 1996 film which assigned the same premise to six young emerging directors

References

External links 

Images from the film at the National Film Board of Canada

1991 films
Canadian drama films
Canadian anthology films
1991 drama films
Films set in Montreal
Films directed by Atom Egoyan
Films directed by Denys Arcand
Films directed by Michel Brault
Films directed by Léa Pool
Films directed by Patricia Rozema
National Film Board of Canada films
Films directed by Jacques Leduc
French-language Canadian films
1990s Canadian films